The Hum Award for Best Television Film is one of the Hum Awards of Merit presented annually by the Hum Television Network and Entertainment Channel (HTNEC) to producers working in the Television industry. Since its inception, however, the award has commonly been referred to as the hum for Best Telefilm.

History
Hum Television Network and Entertainment Channel presented this award to producers of Pakistani TV industry, as of first ceremony total of four telefilms were nominated and Asim Raza was honored at 2nd Hum Awards ceremony 2012 for telefilm Behadd.

Winners and nominees
In the list below, winners are listed first in the colored row, followed by the other nominees. Following the hum's practice, the telefilms below are listed by year of their Pakistan qualifying run, which is usually (but not always) the sitcom's year of release.

For the first ceremony, the eligibility period spanned full calendar years. For example, the 2nd Hum Awards presented on March 29, 2014, to declared the best telefilms of the years that were released between January, 2013, and December, 2013, the period of eligibility is the full previous calendar year from January 1 to December 31.

Date and the award ceremony shows that the 2010 is the period from 2010-2020 (10 years-decade), while the year above winners and nominees shows that the telefilms year in which they were telecast, and the figure in bracket shows the ceremony number, for example; an award ceremony is held for the dramas of its previous year.

2010s

References

External links
Official websites
 Hum Awards official website
 Hum Television Network and Entertainment Channel (HTNEC)
 Hum's Channel at YouTube (run by the Hum Television Network and Entertainment Channel)
 Hum Awards at Facebook (run by the Hum Television Network and Entertainment Channel)]

Hum Awards
Hum Award winners
Hum TV
Hum Network Limited